William Byrd I (1652 – December 4, 1704) was an English-born Virginia colonist and politician. He came from the Shadwell section of London, where his father John Bird (c. 1620–1677) was a goldsmith. His family's ancestral roots were in Cheshire.

Personal life
On the invitation of his maternal uncle, Thomas Stegge Jr., in March 1669, William Bird/Byrd immigrated to Virginia. In Virginia, the spelling Byrd became standard. On October 27, 1673, he was granted  on the James River. Byrd became a well-connected fur trader in what would later become the Richmond, Virginia area. Some of Byrd's landholdings became (after his death) part of the site of modern-day Richmond, Virginia. About 1673, he married a 21-year-old widow named Mary (née Horsmanden) Filmer, a native of Lenham, England. Mary's father had spent time in Virginia as a Cavalier fleeing Cromwell, and her former husband Samuel Filmer (third son of Tory author Robert Filmer) descended from the sister of Samuel Argall, governor of Virginia. 

William Byrd I and his wife would become the parents of William Byrd II and three daughters. Their daughter, Ursula, at age 16, married Robert Beverley Jr., Major Robert Beverley's son. They had one child, William Beverley (1698–1756), and Ursula died in 1698, within a year of her marriage. Colonel William Beverley married Richard Bland's daughter, Elizabeth Bland. They had four children. Their son, Robert, married Maria Carter on February 3, 1763. Her parents were Landon Carter and Maria Byrd.

Biography
In 1676, Byrd was a sympathizer of Nathaniel Bacon in Bacon's Rebellion, and took an active part in the rebellion, first by helping persuade Bacon to take unlawful command of a militia and lead it against the Indians. He also rode with Bacon after the rebellion began and was involved in the sack of Warner Hall, confiscating goods amounting to £845, or the equivalent of what 40 slaves or servants would produce in a year. He later allied himself with the Governor and became a prominent citizen.

Also in 1676, Byrd established the James River Fort on the south bank of the James River in what is now known as the Manchester District of Richmond. Byrd was elected to the Virginia House of Burgesses in 1677 and later served many years on the Governor's Council.

In 1688, Theodorick Bland Jr. and his brother Richard conveyed 1,200 acres of their Westover Plantation property to William Byrd I in 1688 for £300 and 10,000 pounds of tobacco and cask. Byrd's grandson built a Georgian mansion there in the 1750s.

Byrd died on 4 December 1704, at his plantation home of Westover, in Charles City County, Virginia. He is buried near the original site of the Westover Church.

Further reading
Murphy, Nathan W. "The Devon Seafaring Origins of William Byrd's Mother's Family: Grace (Stegge) Byrd of London, Thomas Stegge of Charles City County, Virginia, and Captain Abraham Read of Charles City County, Virginia; Including Additional Details about William Byrd's Father John Byrd's Career as a London Goldsmith," The American Genealogist 84 (2010), 241–56.
Rice, James D. (2012). Tales from a Revolution. New York: Oxford University Press.

References

External links

Biography at Virtualology.com

1652 births
1704 deaths
People from Shadwell
William Byrd I
English emigrants
American planters
Virginia Governor's Council members